Adinia Wirasti Wijayanto (born 19 January 1987), better known as Adinia Wirasti, is an Indonesian actress of Javanese descent. In 2008, she graduated from the New York Film Academy one year Screenwriting Program in Los Angeles, CA.

Early life 
Adinia Wirasti is of Javanese descent. In her childhood she was introduced to Javanese culture such as wayang by her grandparents.

Career 
Adinia started her career as a model in a youth magazine. Her acting debut occurred when she starred in the film Ada Apa Dengan Cinta? (What's Up With Love?) in 2002. In the film she played Karmen.

She won the Citra Award for Best Supporting Actress at the 2005 Indonesian Film Festival for her role in the film Tentang Dia. In the film, Adinia plays the role of Rudy. In addition, she also received an award at the Bandung Film Festival for the same film.

In 2006, Adinia acted in the film Dunia Mereka and Ruang. In March 2007, Adinia returned in the film 3 Hari untuk Selamanya directed by Riri Riza.

In 2013, Adinia won the Citra Award for Best Actress at the 2013 Indonesian Film Festival for the film Laura & Marsha.

Filmography

Awards and nominations

References

External links

Indonesian film actresses
Actresses from Jakarta
1987 births
Living people
Maya Award winners
Citra Award winners
Javanese people